Vladyslav Ostroushko (born 5 March 1986) is a Ukrainian handball player for RK Eurofarm Rabotnik and the Ukrainian national team.

He represented Ukraine at the 2020 European Men's Handball Championship.

References

1986 births
Living people
Ukrainian male handball players
Sportspeople from Cherkasy
Expatriate handball players in Poland
Expatriate handball players in Turkey
Ukrainian expatriate sportspeople in Belarus
Ukrainian expatriate sportspeople in North Macedonia
Ukrainian expatriate sportspeople in Poland
Ukrainian expatriate sportspeople in Romania
Ukrainian expatriate sportspeople in Russia
Ukrainian expatriate sportspeople in Switzerland
Ukrainian expatriate sportspeople in Turkey
Olympiacos H.C. players
ZTR players
HC Motor Zaporizhia players
21st-century Ukrainian people